Parliamentary elections were held in Iraq on 30 April 2014. The elections decided the 328 members of the Council of Representatives who will in turn elect the Iraqi president and prime minister.

Electoral system
The open list form of party-list proportional representation, using the governorates as the constituencies, is the electoral system used. The counting system has been changed slightly from the largest remainder method to the modified Sainte-Laguë method due to a ruling by the Supreme Court of Iraq that the previous method discriminated against smaller parties. Seven "compensatory" seats that were awarded at the national level to those parties whose national share of the vote wasn't reflected in the seats won at the governorate level have been allocated to individual governorates. Eight seats remain reserved for minority groups at the national level: five for Assyrians and one each for Mandaeans, Yezidis, and Shabaks.

Seat allocation
Prior to the elections, the parliament decided to expand from 325 to 328. As with the 2010 elections, 8 seats were reserved for ethnic and religious minorities. Unlike previous elections, there were no compensatory seats.

Campaign
The campaign was expected to focus on competition within the three main religious and ethnic communities: Shi'ite Arabs, Sunni Arabs and Kurds. While under the Constitution of Iraq the head of the largest coalition has the first call to become prime minister, in a precedent set following the 2010 election, a revised coalition can be formed following the election. This reduced the incentive for parties to form broad coalitions prior to the election. So in November 2011, Iraq's Independent High Electoral Commission approved 276 political entities to run in the elections, including a number of coalitions.

Shi'ite Arabs were split between the Prime Minister's State of Law Coalition, the Sadrist al-Ahrar Bloc, and the Islamic Supreme Council of Iraq backed al-Muwatin coalition. The former secular, non-sectarian Iraqiya bloc – 2010 the strongest force elected into parliament – had broken apart into Usama al-Nujayfi's Sunni regionalist Muttahidoon coalition, Ayad Allawi's National Coalition al-Wataniya, and Saleh al-Mutlaq's al-Arabiya Coalition. And the two prominent Kurdish parties, Masoud Barzani's Kurdistan Democratic Party (KDP) and Jalal Talabani's Patriotic Union of Kurdistan (PUK), were joined by a third Kurdish party, the Movement for Change (Gorran) headed by Nawshirwan Mustafa.

Conduct
As members of the security forces voted on Monday 28 April, six different polling stations were hit by suicide bombers, leading to at least 27 deaths. Insurgent group Islamic State of Iraq and Syria has threatened violence against Sunni Muslims who vote in the election.

Results
The IHEC confirmed the results on 25 May.

By governorate

Al Anbar Governorate

Arbil Governorate

Babil Governorate

Baghdad Governorate

Basra Governorate

Dhi Qar Governorate

Diyala Governorate

Dohuk Governorate

Karbala Governorate

Kirkuk Governorate

Maysan Governorate

Muthanna Governorate

Najaf Governorate

Nineveh Governorate

Al-Qādisiyyah Governorate

Saladin Governorate

Sulaymaniyah Governorate

Wasit Governorate

Candidate votes

Government formation
The first session of the new parliament began on 1 July where all 328 members took oath to carry out their legal tasks and responsibilities devotedly and honestly and preserve the independence and sovereignty of Iraq, and safeguard the interests of its people. The constitution mentions that in the first session, the parliament has to elect a Speaker for the House along with two deputies. This didn't happen as some Kurdish and Sunni Arab MPs boycotted the session causing a lack of quorum since they did not agree on a single candidate. The next session took place on 13 July and brought about a consensus for the post of Speaker after it was announced that Salim al-Jabouri was the candidate.
After Salim al-Jabouri was voted as Speaker of the House, the parliament voted for Fuad Masum as president who in turn asked Haider al-Abadi to form a government on 11 August. The government was formed on 8 September 2014 with most parties being part of the new government.

References

2014 elections in Iraq
Iraq
Elections in Iraq
April 2014 events in Iraq
Election and referendum articles with incomplete results